Stanley Roger Tupper (January 25, 1921 – January 6, 2006) was a U.S. Representative from Maine, serving three terms from 1961 to 1967.

Early life
Born in Boothbay Harbor, Maine, Tupper was educated in Boothbay Harbor public schools, and he graduated from Hebron Academy in Hebron, Maine.  He then attended Middlebury College in Middlebury, Vermont.

Start of career
In 1942 at age 21, Tupper joined the United States Border Patrol, completed training in El Paso, Texas, and carried out assignments on both the Mexican and Canadian borders.

Tupper joined the United States Navy in mid-World War II; he served from September 1944 to March 1946, and was discharged as a Petty Officer Third Class.   He returned to the Border Patrol until resigning in 1948, when he returned to Maine and began to study law with his father while also taking law school courses through LaSalle Extension University of Chicago, Illinois.

He graduated from LaSalle University in 1948, was admitted to the bar in 1949, and began to practice in Boothbay Harbor.  Tupper also began to serve in local government; he was elected to the Boothbay Harbor board of selectmen in 1948, and was selected to serve as chairman in 1949.  As a selectman, he took a lead role in creating the town's police department, and his other initiatives included adopting the secret ballot for election of town officials, competitive bidding for town equipment and services, and the town manager form of government.

A Republican, Tupper served as member of the Maine House of Representatives from 1953 to 1954, as assistant state attorney general from 1959 to 1960, and as commissioner of the state Department of Sea and Shore Fisheries from 1953 to 1957.

Congressman
Tupper was elected as a Republican to the Eighty-seventh and the two succeeding Congresses (January 3, 1961 – January 3, 1967).

Tupper was one of two Republicans to co-sponsor Medicare, and his Congressional career was also notable for his support of the Civil Rights Acts of 1964 and 1965.

In 1966, along with three Republican Senators and four other Republican Representatives, Tupper signed a telegram sent to Georgia Governor Carl E. Sanders regarding the Georgia legislature's refusal to seat the recently elected Julian Bond in the Georgia House of Representatives. This refusal, said the telegram, was "a dangerous attack on representative government. None of us agree with Mr. Bond's views on the Vietnam War; in fact we strongly repudiate these views. But unless otherwise determined by a court of law, which the Georgia Legislature is not, he is entitled to express them."

Later career
Tupper was not a candidate for reelection to the Ninetieth Congress in 1966.  He was appointed United States Commissioner General to the Canadian World Exhibition of 1967.  He resumed the practice of law in 1968.  In 1969, Tupper was appointed president of the States’ Urban Action Center, a non-profit entity created by Nelson Rockefeller to aid state governors with identifying problems unique to cities and crafting solutions.

From 1969 to 1972, Tupper practiced law in Washington, D.C., as a partner in the firm now known as Rogers & Wells.  In 1972, he returned to Boothbay Harbor and continued to practice law.  In 1975, he declined a position as an Assistant Secretary of Defense in the administration of Gerald Ford.  From 1975 to 1976, Tupper was United States Commissioner on the North East Atlantic Fisheries Commission.

Career as author
Tupper was the co-author of One Continent-Two Voices, a book on Canadian-American relations.  He also authored a set of memoirs based on the notable individuals he met during his life, which was titled Recollections.

In addition to his writing, Tupper lectured at several colleges and universities, and served on a number of government and civic boards and commissions, including the Maine Maritime Academy Board of Trustees, St. Andrews Hospital of Boothbay, Bigelow Laboratory for Ocean Sciences, and the U.S. Civil Rights Advisory Commission.

Tupper was a recipient of the honorary degree of LL.D. from Ricker College.

Death and burial
Tupper died in Boothbay Harbor on January 6, 2006.

Family
Tupper's first wife was Esther McKown; they were the parents of a son, Stanley R. Tupper Jr.

After his 1968 divorce from his first wife,  Tupper was married to Jill Kaplan Tupper, an attorney who practiced law in partnership with him.  Their children included daughter Lara Abigail.

References

Sources

Internet

Books

Newspapers

External links

1921 births
2006 deaths
People from Boothbay Harbor, Maine
Middlebury College alumni
Republican Party members of the Maine House of Representatives
Maine local politicians
Maine lawyers
State cabinet secretaries of Maine
Republican Party members of the United States House of Representatives from Maine
20th-century American politicians
20th-century American lawyers
United States Navy personnel of World War II
United States Navy sailors